The Re Umberto class were a group of three ironclad battleships built for the Italian Navy in the 1880s and 1890s. The ships—, and —were built as the culmination of a major naval expansion program begun in the 1870s following Italy's defeat at the Battle of Lissa in 1866. The Re Umbertos incorporated several innovations over previous Italian designs, including a more efficient arrangement of the main battery, installation of wireless telegraphs, and in Sardegna, the first use of triple-expansion steam engines in an Italian capital ship. Designed by Benedetto Brin, they retained the very thin armor protection and high top speeds of his earlier designs.

All three ships served in the Active Squadron for the first decade of their careers, which proved to be uneventful. They were transferred to the Reserve Squadron in 1905, and by the outbreak of the Italo-Turkish War in 1911, they were serving as training ships. They provided fire support to Italian troops fighting in Libya during the conflict and took part in the seizure of several Ottoman ports, including Tripoli. During World War I, Sardegna was used as a guard ship in Venice, while Re Umberto served as a floating battery in Brindisi and Sicilia was reduced to a depot ship. All three ships survived the war and were broken up for scrap in the early 1920s.

Design
Starting in the 1870s, following the Italian fleet's defeat at the Battle of Lissa, the Italians began a large naval expansion program, aimed at countering the Austro-Hungarian Navy. The Re Umberto class was the culmination of the first phase of the program, which saw ten modern ironclad battleships built; these ships placed Italy with the third largest navy in the world, after Great Britain and France. The three Re Umbertos were designed by Benedetto Brin, then the president of the Committee for Naval Projects, and who had overseen most of the ironclad construction program. The first two ships were authorized in 1883, and in 1885 Brin, who was then the naval minister, proposed a third vessel.

General characteristics and machinery

The three ships of the class differed slightly in their dimensions; Re Umberto and Sicilia were the same length and width but Sardegna was longer. The ships were fitted with a single military mast with two fighting tops amidships. Sardegna was one of the first warships equipped with Marconi's new wireless telegraph. The ships' crews also varied in size, from 733 officers and men aboard Re Umberto, to 736 for Sicilia and 794 on Sardegna.

The propulsion system for Re Umberto and Sicilia consisted of a pair of horizontal compound steam engines each driving a single screw propeller, with steam supplied by eighteen coal-fired, cylindrical fire-tube boilers. These ships' engines were manufactured by Gio. Ansaldo & C., based on a design from Maudslay, Sons and Field. Sardegna instead received a pair of  triple-expansion steam engines, with the same number and type of boilers; she was the first Italian warship to be equipped with triple expansion engines. The ships' boilers were trunked into three funnels, with two side-by-side just aft of the conning tower, and the third further aft.

Armament and armor

The ships of the Re Umberto class were armed with a main battery of four  30-caliber guns, mounted in two twin-gun turrets, one on either end of the ship. This was more efficient than the arrangement used in previous designs, with both pairs of guns mounted in a central barbette that limited their arcs of fire. The guns were the Pattern B type manufactured by Armstrong Whitworth. The guns could elevate to 15 degrees and depress to −5 degrees; elevation was controlled by hand, and loading required the guns to be elevated to 15 degrees.

They carried a secondary battery of eight  40-caliber guns placed singly in shielded mounts atop the upper deck, with four on each broadside. Close-range defense against torpedo boats was provided by a battery of sixteen  guns in casemates in the upper deck aboard Re Umberto, eight on each broadside. Sicilia and Sardegna both had twenty of these guns, with ten per side. These were supported by sixteen  43-caliber guns and ten  guns. As was customary for capital ships of the period, they carried five  torpedo tubes in above-water launchers.

The ships were lightly armored for their size; the savings in weight allowed for the high top speed, which was typical for Italian capital ships of the period. This was especially true of those designed by Brin, who argued that armor technology of the time could not defeat contemporary heavy guns. The ships' armor consisted of steel manufactured by Schneider-Creusot.

Construction

Service history

For their first decade in service, all three ships saw duty in the Active Squadron of the Italian fleet, though their early careers were uneventful. Re Umberto and Sardegna made visits to Britain and Germany in 1895, the latter for the opening of the Kaiser Wilhelm Canal. The ships were involved in an international naval demonstration off Crete in 1897 before the Greco-Turkish War.

The three ships saw significant action during the Italo-Turkish War of 1911–1912, primarily conducting operations in support of Italian troops fighting in Libya. From October to December 1911, the ships were stationed off Tripoli, where they bombarded Ottoman defenses to prepare for the initial landing and then provided fire support to Italian forces after they had seized the city. After returning to Italy for resupply, the ships were tasked with escorting troop convoys to attack other ports in Libya from June to August 1912.

After the war, Sicilia became a depot ship for the new dreadnought  in Taranto, and Re Umberto became a depot ship in Genoa. After Italy entered World War I in 1915, Sardegna was stationed in Venice as the flagship of the naval forces defending the port and Re Umberto returned to service as a floating battery in Brindisi. After the catastrophic defeat at the Battle of Caporetto in November 1917, Sardegna was withdrawn from Venice to Brindisi, and later to Taranto. In 1918, Re Umberto was converted into an assault ship for the planned attack on the main Austro-Hungarian naval base at Pola, but the war ended before the attack could be carried out. She was stricken in 1920 and broken up for scrap; Sicilia and Sardegna followed in 1923.

Footnotes

References
 
 
 
 
 
 
 
 Robinson, Charles N., ed. (1897). The Navy and Army Illustrated (London: Hudson & Kearns) III (32).

Further reading

External links

 Re Umberto (1888) Marina Militare website

 

Battleship classes